George Henry Minott (December 15, 1893 - June 22, 1957) was an American politician from Maine.

Biography
He was born on December 15, 1893.

Minott, a Republican, served three terms as the Mayor of South Portland, Maine from 1926 to 1928. He also served a single term in the Maine Senate from 1929 to 1930.

He died on June 22, 1957.

References

1893 births
1957 deaths
Mayors of South Portland, Maine
Republican Party Maine state senators
20th-century American politicians